Alio Die, the stage name of Stefano Musso, is an Italian ambient-music composer and producer. Stefano Musso studied art and electronics in Milan, Italy, and began performing music in 1989.

Overview 
His music is a fusion of acoustical elements, samples, echoing percussion, and deep, atmospheric sound design with elements of entropic formlessness. Alio Die's style has a lot in common with traditional Indian raga music in building an entire song from a simple, continuous starting tone.

Label Press wrote the following about him:

Discography

Solo albums 
 1991, Introspective
 1992, Under An Holy Ritual
 1996, Suspended Feathers
 1997, The Hidden Spring
 1998, Password For Entheogenic Experience
 1999, Le Stanze Della Transcendenza
 2001, Incantamento
 2001, Leaves Net
 2003, Il Tempo Magico Di Saturnia Pavonia
 2003, Khen Introduce Silence
 2004, Angel's Fly Souvenir
 2004, Sol Niger
 2006, The Flight Of Real Image
 2008, Aura Seminalis
 2008, Tempus Rei
 2010, Tripudium Naturae
 2010, Horas Tibi Serenas 
 2011, Honeysuckle 
 2012, Deconsecrated & Pure
 2014, Sitar Meditations
 2015, Standing In A Place
 2016, Imaginal Symmetry
 2016, An Unfathomable Convergence
 2016, Seamlessly Bliss
 2017, They Grow Layers of Life Within
 2017, Time Zone Portal
 2018, Kalisz Concert
 2019, Allegorical Traces, Pt.1

Collaboration albums 
 1997, Fissures (with Robert Rich)
 1999, Healing Herb's Spirit (with Antonio Testa)
 1999, Echo Passage (with Vidna Obmana)
 2000, Aquam Metallicam (with Nick Parkin)
 2001, Apsaras (with Amelia Cuni)
 2002, Expanding Horizon (with Mathias Grassow)
 2002, Prayer For The Forest (with Antonio Testa)
 2003, The Sleep Of Seeds (with Saffron Wood)
 2003, Sunja (with Zeit)
 2004, Angel's Fly Souvenir (with Francesco Paladino)
 2005, Il Sogno Di Un Piano Veneziano A Parigi (with Festina Lente)
 2005, Aqua Planing (with Werner Durand)
 2005, Mei-Jyu (with Jack Or Jive)
 2006, Corteggiando Le Messi (with Saffron Wood)
 2007, End Of An Era (with Luciano Daini)
 2007, Sospensione D'Estate (with James Johnson)
 2007, Raag Drone Theory (with Zeit)
 2008, Eleusian Lullaby (with Martina Galvagni)
 2009, Private History Of The Clouds (with Aglaia)
 2010, Circo Divino (with Parallel Worlds)
 2010, Il Giardino Ermeneutico (with Zeit)
 2010, Praha Meditations (with Mathias Grassow)
 2011, Vayu Rouah (with Aglaia)
 2012, Otter Songs (with Lingua Fungi)
 2012, Rêverie (with Antonio Testa)
 2013, A Circular Quest (with Zeit)
 2014, Amidst The Circling Spires (with Sylvi Alli)
 2014, Elusive Metaphor (with Parallel Worlds)
 2015, Holographic Codex (with Lorenzo Montanà)
 2017, Lento (with Lingua Fungi)
 2017, Opera Magnetica (with Aglaia)
 2018, Amitabha (with Aglaia)
 2019, Tempus Fugit (with Indalaska)

References

External links 
 Alio Die on Bandcamp
 Alio Die's former official site

Ambient musicians
Italian electronic musicians